Amata symphona  is a species of moth of the family Erebidae first described by Charles Swinhoe in 1907. It is found on Borneo.

External links

symphona
Moths described in 1907
Moths of Borneo